The Old St. Nicholas Church is a Romanian Orthodox church located at 1 Cotești Street in Focșani, Romania. It is dedicated to Saint Nicholas.

The church was built between 1713 and 1716. It is listed as a historic monument by Romania's Ministry of Culture and Religious Affairs.

Notes

Religious buildings and structures in Focșani
Historic monuments in Vrancea County
Romanian Orthodox churches in Vrancea County
Churches completed in 1716